Jawaid Iqbal is a retired Pakistani-born Hong Kong cricketer. A right-handed batsman and right-arm off spin bowler, he first played for the Hong Kong cricket team in 2000.

Biography

Born in Sialkot in 1972, Jawaid Iqbal first represented Hong Kong at cricket in the 2000 ACC Trophy in the UAE. He next played for them in the 2001 ICC Trophy in Ontario. He played in the ACC Trophy tournaments of 2002 and 2004.

In April 2005 he made his first-class debut, playing against the UAE in the 2005 ICC Intercontinental Cup. He played an ACC Fast Track Countries Tournament match against Malaysia later in the year. His last match to date for Hong Kong was an ACC Premier League match against Singapore in September 2006. He played in a sixes tournament in Hua Hin in April 2007.

Iqbal coached the Hong Kong national under-19 cricket team at the 2019 ACC Under-19 Eastern Region tournament.

References

1972 births
Living people
Jawaid Iqbal
Cricketers from Sialkot
Sportspeople of Pakistani descent
Pakistani emigrants to Hong Kong